Sponsler may refer to:
Sponsler, Indiana, an unincorporated community in the United States
Claire Sponsler (1954 - 2016), American academic and writer
Karen Sponsler-Porter, producer of 2000s American children's TV series Nanna's Cottage